Viktor Borisovich Krivulin (9 July 1944 – 17 March 2001) was a Russian poet, novelist and essayist.

Biography 
Krivulin graduated from the faculty of philology from Leningrad State University. He opted for independent cultural activity and worked mostly as a watchman, editor of short living leaflets of sanitary education while heading some important institutions of Russian uncensored literature of 1970s, such as «37» and «Severnaya Pochta» samizdat magazines among others. Later Krivulin was involved with other samizdat journals  Obvodnyi Kanal and Chasy, the journal of the Leningrad alternative culture club «Klub-81».

In 1978 Krivulin became the first winner of Andrei Bely independent literary prize and then for more than ten years he participated in running this award.

After the collapse of the Soviet Union Krivulin served as co-chairman of the St Petersburg branch of the Democratic Russia party, where he worked with the reformer Galina Starovoitova murdered in November 1998.

Work

Krivulin's poetic output reflects some features of the postmodern current that has been variously labelled as neomodernism and metarealism. For many years, his poetry circulated exclusively in samizdat (Leningrad journals such as Chasy [The Clock], «37» and Obvodnyi kanal), as well as the émigré journals Grani ("Facets"), Tret’ia volna ("The Third Wave"), Vestnik RKhD ("Herald of the Russian Christian Movement") and Kontinent.

Krivulin's first poetry collection was published in 1981 in Paris and was followed with the two volumes of selected poems released in 1988. His first official Soviet publication appeared only in 1985 in the pages of the club's anthology, Krug. Krivulin's first book in the Soviet Union was published in 1990.

Personal life
Krivulin was married several times. His first wife was the philosopher Tatyana Goricheva, with whom they organized unofficial seminars and edited the journal 37, named after the number of their communal apartment. In 60s before getting married with Goricheva, Krivulin started a relationship with Masha Ivashintsova, clandestine street photographer whose works were discovered by her relatives in the family attic and made public. They were breaking up and getting back together several times until Masha's death in 2000.

Collections in Russian

 1981: Stikhi (Poems), Paris: Rhythm.  
 1988: Stikhi (Poems), Paris, Leningrad: Beseda 
 1990: Obraschenie (Appeal), Leningrad: Sovetsky Pisatel  
 1993: Konzert po Zayavkam (Concert on request), Saint-Petersburg: Publishing house of the Fund of Russian Poetry  
 1994: Predgranichie: Teksty 1993-94 (Frontier: Texts of 1993–94), Saint-Petersburg: Borey Art   
 1998: Requiem, Moscow: ARGO-RISK.  
 1998: Kupanie v iordani (Bathing in the Jordan River), Saint-Petersburg, Pushkin Fund 
 2001: Stikhi yubileinogo goda (Poems of the jubilee year), Moscow: OGI 
 2001: Stikhi posle stikhov (Poems after poems), Saint-Petersburg: Peterburgsky pisatel

See also

References

Sources 
 Johnson, Kent (1992). Third Wave: The New Russian Poetry, The University of Michigan Press

External links
 Sandler S. A Poet Living in the Big City: Viktor Krivulin, Among Others. In: Boudreau N, O'Neil C Poetics. Self. Place: Essays to Honor Anna Lisa Crone. Columbus, Ohio: Slavica ; 2007.
 The Spirit(s) of the Leningrad Underground: Viktor Krivulin's Communion with Russian Modernism. Clint B. Walker. The Slavic and East European Journal. Vol. 43, No. 4 (Winter, 1999), pp. 674-698.
 Michael Molnar (2001) Viktor Krivulin (1944–2001), Slavonica, 7:2, 116-118.

1944 births
2001 deaths
20th-century Russian poets
Writers from Saint Petersburg
Russian Jews
Russian male poets
Soviet dissidents